Lyptsi is a village in the Kharkiv Raion, Kharkiv Oblast, Ukraine.  Situated at the point where the Lypets River flows into the Kharkiv River, Lyptsi is close to the border with Russia. It hosts the administration of Lyptsi rural hromada, one of the hromadas of Ukraine.

History
The village was founded in 1655 by peasants from Right-bank Ukraine.

As part of the 2022 Russian invasion of Ukraine, the village was occupied by the Russian Armed Forces on 24 February 2022, a situation that continued into April.  By 10 May, a Ukrainian counter-offensive to the north of Kharkiv meant that Lyptsi was contested. Ukraine regained control of the village on 11 September 2022 as part of a major counteroffensive in the Kharkhiv region.

References

Villages in Kharkiv Raion
Populated places established in 1655
Kharkovsky Uyezd